

Tahiti
Marama Vahirua – Nantes, Nice, Lorient, AS Nancy – 1999–2011

Togo
 Emmanuel Adebayor – Metz, AS Monaco – 2001–02, 2003–05
 Kossi Agassa – Metz – 2003–06
 Kuami Agboh – Auxerre – 1998–2003
 Komlan Assignon – Cannes – 1996–98
 Floyd Ayité – AS Nancy, Bordeaux – 2009–11
 Jonathan Ayité – Brest – 2011–14
 Loïc Bessilé – Bordeaux – 2020–21
 Razak Boukari – Lens, Rennes, Sochaux – 2006–12
 Kévin Denkey – Nîmes – 2019–21
 Karimou Djibrill – AS Monaco – 1958–65
 Matthieu Dossevi – Metz, Toulouse – 2017–20
 Othniel Dossevi – Paris SG – 1974–75
 Pierre-Antoine Dossevi – Paris SG, Tours – 1975–76, 1980–81
 Thomas Dossevi – Valenciennes, Nantes – 2006–07, 2008–09
 Franck Fiawoo – Marseille – 1966–67, 1968–69
 Koffi Fiawoo – Sochaux – 1998–99
 Serge Gakpé – Monaco – 2005–11
 Kwami Hodouto – Cannes – 1995–97
 Josué Homawoo – Nantes – 2019–20
 Kerim Ibrahim – RC Paris – 1962–64
Thibault Klidjé – Bordeaux – 2021–22
 Robert Malm – Lens, Toulouse FC – 1991–93, 1998–99
 Gilbert Moevi – Bordeaux – 1959–60, 1962–67
 Adékambi Olufadé – Lille, Nice – 2001–03
 Djima Oyawolé – Metz – 1996–97, 1998–99, 2000–01
Alaixys Romao – Grenoble, Lorient, Marseille, Reims – 2008–16, 2018–20
Prince Segbefia – Auxerre – 2010-12
 Yao Sènaya – Cannes – 1997–98
 Gilles Sunu – Lorient, Évian, Angers – 2010–18
 Abibou Tchagnao – Martigues – 1995–96
 Kader Touré – Sochaux – 2004–05
 Gilbert Wilson – Alès – 1958–59

Trinidad and Tobago
John Bostock – Toulouse FC – 2018–19

Tunisia
 Nourredine Aouiriri – Toulouse FC – 1984–85
 Anis Ayari – Lorient – 2006–07
 Larry Azouni – Lorient – 2013–14
 Taoufik Belghilt – Monaco – 1971–72
 Saber Ben Frej – Le Mans – 2008–10
 Fahid Ben Khalfallah – Caen, Valenciennes, Bordeaux – 2008–14
 Issam Ben Khémis – Lorient – 2015–17
 Kamel Ben Mustapha – Paris SG – 1972–73
 Moktar Ben Nacef – Nice – 1948–51, 1953–55
Chaouki Ben Saada – Bastia, Nice, Troyes – 2002–05, 2008–11, 2015–16, 2017–18
 Mehdi Ben Slimane – Marseille – 1996–97
 Fakhreddine Ben Youssef – Metz – 2014–15
 Syam Ben Youssef – Caen – 2015–17
 Selim Benachour – Paris SG, Troyes – 2001–04
 Yohan Benalouane – AS Saint-Étienne – 2007–11
 Ali Boumnijel – AS Nancy, Gueugnon, Bastia – 1991–92, 1995–96, 1998–2003
 Raouf Bouzaiene – Châteauroux – 1997–98
Dylan Bronn – Metz – 2019–22
 Fabien Camus – Marseille, Troyes – 2003–04, 2012–13
 Adel Chedli – Saint-Étienne, Sochaux, Istres – 1994–96, 1998–99, 2001–05
 Amine Chermiti – Gazélec Ajaccio – 2015–16
 José Clayton – Bastia – 1998–2001
 Aïmen Demai – Metz – 2001–02, 2003–04
 Chérif Gabsi – Marseille – 1949–50
 Haykel Guemamdia – Strasbourg – 2005–06
 Mohsen Habacha – Ajaccio – 1969–70
 Oussama Haddadi – Dijon – 2016–19
 Karim Haggui – Strasbourg – 2004–06
 Mouez Hassen – Nice – 2013–16
 Kassem Hassouna – Le Havre, Lens – 1950–58, 1959–60
 Hamadi Henia – AS Monaco – 1953–55
 Assil Jaziri – Nice – 2018–19
 Ziad Jaziri – Troyes – 2005–07
 Issam Jemâa – Lens, Caen, Auxerre, Brest – 2005–12
 Ammar Jemal – Ajaccio – 2012–13
 David Jemmali – Cannes, Bordeaux, Grenoble – 1995–2010
 Hamdi Kasraoui – Lens – 2009–11
 Brahim Kerrit – Nice – 1962–64
 Saber Khalifa – Évian, Marseille – 2011–14
 Saîf-Eddine Khaoui – Marseille, Troyes, Caen, Clermont – 2016–
 Wahbi Khazri – Bastia, Bordeaux, Rennes, Saint-Étienne, Montpellier – 2012–16, 2017–
 Témime Lahzami – Marseille – 1979–80
Aïssa Laïdouni – Angers – 2015–16
 Mohamed Larbi – Gazélec Ajaccio – 2015–16
 Imed Mhedhebi – Nantes – 2005–06
Yassin Mikari – Sochaux – 2008–13
 Mehdi Nafti – Toulouse FC – 1997–99, 2000–01
 Hamed Namouchi – Lorient – 2006–09
 Hocine Ragued – Paris SG – 2005–06
 Faouzi Rouissi – Caen – 1992–94
Jamel Saihi – Montpellier, Angers – 2009–17
 Francileudo Santos – Sochaux, Toulouse FC – 2001–09
 Ferjani Sassi – Metz – 2014–15
 Adel Sellimi – Nantes – 1996–97
 Ellyes Skhiri – Montpellier – 2014–19
 Naïm Sliti – LOSC Lille, Dijon – 2016–19
 Bassem Srarfi – Nice – 2016–20
Montassar Talbi – Lorient – 2022–
 Nabil Taïder – Toulouse FC, Lorient – 2003–07
 Yoann Touzghar – Lens, Troyes, Ajaccio – 2014–15, 2021–
 Yan Valery – Angers – 2022–
 Alaeddine Yahia – Guingamp, Saint-Étienne, Sedan, Nice, Lens, Caen – 2001–11, 2014–17
Moataz Zemzemi – Strasbourg – 2018–20
 Ali Zitouni – Troyes – 2005–06

Turkey
Doğan Alemdar – Rennes – 2021–
 Umut Bozok – Nîmes, FC Lorient – 2018–19, 2020–21
 Zeki Çelik – Lille – 2018–22
 Mevlüt Erdinç – Sochaux, Paris SG, Rennes, Saint-Étienne, Guingamp, Metz – 2005–17
 Metehan Güçlü – Paris SG – 2018–19
 Serdar Gürler – Sochaux – 2009–10
 Deniz Hümmet – Troyes – 2015–16
 Hasan Kabze – Montpellier – 2010–12
 Colin Kazim-Richards – Toulouse FC – 2009–10
 Lefter Küçükandonyadis – Nice – 1952–53
 Yusuf Sari – Marseille – 2017–18
 Atila Turan – Reims – 2013–14, 2015–16
 Bülent Üçüncü – Lorient – 1998–99
 Cengiz Ünder – Marseille – 2021–
 Engin Verel – Lille – 1981–83
 Yusuf Yazıcı – Lille – 2019–
 Burak Yılmaz – Lille – 2020–22

References and notes

Books

Club pages
AJ Auxerre former players
AJ Auxerre former players
Girondins de Bordeaux former players
Girondins de Bordeaux former players
Les ex-Tangos (joueurs), Stade Lavallois former players
Olympique Lyonnais former players
Olympique de Marseille former players
FC Metz former players
AS Monaco FC former players
Ils ont porté les couleurs de la Paillade... Montpellier HSC Former players
AS Nancy former players
FC Nantes former players
Paris SG former players
Red Star Former players
Red Star former players
Stade de Reims former players
Stade Rennais former players
CO Roubaix-Tourcoing former players
AS Saint-Étienne former players
Sporting Toulon Var former players

Others

stat2foot
footballenfrance
French Clubs' Players in European Cups 1955-1995, RSSSF
Finnish players abroad, RSSSF
Italian players abroad, RSSSF
Romanians who played in foreign championships
Swiss players in France, RSSSF
EURO 2008 CONNECTIONS: FRANCE, Stephen Byrne Bristol Rovers official site

Notes

France
 
Association football player non-biographical articles